The 2013 European Junior Swimming Championships were held from 10 to 14 July 2013 in Poznań, Poland. The Championships were organized by LEN, the European Swimming League, and were held in a 50-meter pool. Per LEN rules, competitors must be age 15 or 16 for girls and 17 or 18 for boys.

Results

Boys

Girls

Mixed Events

Medal table

Participating countries 
42 countries will take part in 2013 European Junior Swimming Championships with total of 511 swimmers.

References

External links 
 

2013 in swimming
European Junior Swimming
European Junior Swimming Championships
Sport in Poznań
21st century in Poznań
Swimming competitions in Poland
International aquatics competitions hosted by Poland
Swimming